Cipher System / By Night is an EP by the Swedish metal bands Cipher System and By Night. Released in 2004.

Track listing

"What If" - 3:30
"Receive, Retrieve and Escalate" - 3:50
"Sufferstream" - 3:19
"Lamentation" - 4:33
"Unseen Oppression" - 3:26
"Obsessed to Hate" - 2:57

Tracks one to three are by Cipher System. Tracks four to six are from By Night.

Musicians
Cipher System:
Daniel - vocals
Johan - Lead Guitar
Magnus - Rhythm Guitar
Henric - Bass
Pontus - drums
Peter - Electronics

By Night:
Adrian Westin - vocals
André Gonzales - Lead and rhythm guitar
Simon Wien - Rhythm and lead guitar
Henrik Persson - Bass
Per Qvarnström - drums

By Night albums
2004 EPs